Hiroshima at-large district is a constituency of the House of Councillors in the Diet of Japan (national legislature). It consists of Hiroshima Prefecture and elects four Councillors, two per election. The current Councillors are

 Minoru Yanagida (since 1998). Member of the Democratic party for the People.
 Shinji Morimoto (since 2013). Member of the Constitutional Democratic Party.
 Haruko Miyaguchi (since 2021). Member of the Constitutional Democratic Party.
 Yoichi Miyazawa (since 2010). Member of the Liberal Democratic Party.

House of Councillors elected members 

†: Died in office ‡: Election nullified #: Resigned to run for Governor

References 

Districts of the House of Councillors (Japan)